13th National Assembly may refer to:

 13th National Assembly of France
 13th National Assembly of Pakistan
 13th National Assembly of South Korea
 13th National Assembly of Vietnam

